Larry Thrasher (born 1959) is an American experimental musician, remixer, and producer. Thrasher was a member of Psychic TV, Thee Majesty and Splinter Test. In addition, Thrasher was in collaboration with Kim Cascone on the experimental noise project Thessalonians. He is credited under the aliases DJ Cheb I Sabbah Wa Mektoub, Baba Larry Ji,. and Larriji. He is also a long time follower of Meher Baba.

Selected discography 
The Thessalonians:
 The Black Field (Silent Records) 1987
 Soulcraft (Silent Records) 1991
 Solaristics (Noh Poetry Records) 2005

Psychic TV:
 Trip Reset (Cleopatra Records) 1994
 Cathedral Engine (Dossier Records) 1994
 Electric Newspaper (CD-Serie) 1995-97
 Cold Blue Torch (Cleopatra Records) 1995

Splinter Test:
 Thee Fractured Garden 1996
 Spatial Memories (Dossier Records) 1997

Thee Majesty:
 Time's Up 1999
 Vitruvian Pan 2007

The Brian Jonestown Massacre
Take It From The Man! 1996

References

External links
About Larry Thrasher
Interview with Larry Thrasher

1959 births
Living people
American experimental musicians
Followers of Meher Baba
Remixers
American record producers
American noise musicians
American electronic musicians
Psychic TV members
Pigface members
Thessalonians (band) members